Ege Üniversitesi is an underground station on the Fahrettin Altay-Evka 3 Line of the İzmir Metro in Bornova. It is located within the campus of Ege University near the site of the former Ege Üniversitesi railway station. The metro station was opened on 20 March 2012 as part of the  eastward extension from Bornova to Evka 3.

History

Ege Üniversitesi was originally a station on the Bornova suburban line, built in 1979 by the Turkish State Railways. The State Railway operated commuter trains from Basmane station in Konak to Ege University, via central Bornova. The station, along with the line east of Bornova station, was closed down in 1990 at the request of the University directorate. Starting in 1996, the railway line west of Bornova station was converted to a rapid transit line and began operations in 2000. The tracks east of Bornova into the campus were still in place until 2007, when the İzmir Metropolitan Municipality began construction of the metro's eastward expansion to Evka 3. Ege Üniversitesi station was rebuilt as a modern underground metro station with two side platforms serving two tracks. The station opened on 20 March 2012, 22 years after the railway station was closed.

References

External links
İzmir Metro - official site

İzmir Metro
Railway stations opened in 2012
2012 establishments in Turkey
Railway stations in İzmir Province
Bornova District